The flag of Martinique consists of a red triangle at the hoist, with two horizontal bands, the upper green and the lower black. It was adopted on 2 February 2023. The flag of France, its parent country, is also flown with official standing due to Martinique's status as a French overseas department/region. The assembly of Martinique flies a flag with the collectivity's logo on it to represent the government.

In 2018, the assembly held a competition to create a flag and anthem for the island, but  years following the presentation of the winners, the flag and anthem were annulled by the local administrative tribunal, as the method of their selection were not deemed within the responsibilities of the council. Then in 2022, the island began a new public vote on an official flag and anthem. The winners were announced on 16 January 2023, but the selected flag design would be withdrawn from consideration at the request of the designer following accusations of plagiarism. Instead, it was decided that the runner-up design, an established flag used by nationalists, would be considered for adoption on 2 February 2023. It was adopted by the assembly with 44 votes in favour and one abstention.

2022 flag consultation 

Prior to 2023, Martinique did not have its own flag. In 2018, the local council held a competition to create a flag and anthem for the island, but  years following the presentation of the winners, the flag and anthem were annulled by the local administrative tribunal, as the method of their selection was not deemed within the responsibilities of the council. In 2022, the island began a public vote on an official flag and anthem. However, turnout for the first phase, which narrowed the choices down to two options, was very low, with only 19,084 voting for a flag and 9,294 for the anthem out of an eligible population of around 300,000. The winners, announced 16 January 2023, were the hummingbird design for the flag and "Ansanm" for the anthem, representing 72.84% and 53.76% of votes cast, respectively. During the second round of voting, turnout remained relatively low, with a total of 26,633 votes cast for a flag, and 10,289 votes cast for an anthem. The design of the hummingbird in the illustrations used in the vote appears to be identical in shape to one present on the Shutterstock website.

The designer, Anaïs Delwaulle, initially defended her use of the stock image and her design in general, but on 23 January announced that she wanted her design withdrawn from the process. The president of the Executive Council accepted this withdrawal, and explained that as a result, the runner-up would be submitted to the Assembly for consideration on 2–3 February. The runner-up design was eventually adopted on 2 February, with 44 votes in favour and one abstention.

Local government flag 

On 1 August 2016, a design competition for the collectivity's logo was opened to all people of age living in Martinique. Out of 647 eligible proposals, a design by 22-year-old graphic artist Stévy Desbonnes was selected. The logo features a hummingbird whose wings form a stylized map of Martinique. The colour ochre represents the local soil and blue represents the ocean.

In late 2016 the local government flag was created, consisting of the new logo on a white background.

Ipséité 

In 2018, the local council launched a competition to create a flag to represent Martinique at international sporting and cultural events. The anthem  (by Rosetta Varasse) and the flag  ("Selfhood") were chosen by the president of the Martinique Executive Council, Alfred Marie-Jeanne. They were officially presented on 10 May 2019. On 15 November 2021 the flag and anthem were annulled by the local administrative tribunal, as the method of their selection were not deemed within the responsibilities of the Executive Council. It is still seen as a cultural symbol.

The flag, designed by Johnny Vigne, depicts a lambi, an emblematic shell of the Antilles whose conch is used as a traditional musical instrument. Around it, 34 Amerindian stars symbolize the 34 municipalities of Martinique and eight segments evoke eight of the different languages spoken on the island: French, Creole, English, Spanish, Portuguese, Italian, Chinese and Arabic. The colour blue refers to the Atlantic Ocean and the Caribbean Sea, while green recalls the steep hills and nature of the territory.

The flag was first flown in June 2019 by Martinique's national football team during their participation at the 2019 CONCACAF Gold Cup.

Nationalist flag 

The  ("red-green-black") flag is the preferred symbol of Martiniquais independence activists. It was designed by Guy Cabort-Masson and Alex Ferdinand in 1968 and secretly transferred to Martinique in 1971.

The colours of the flag are also found on the pan-African flag, designed in 1920. The pan-African flag has many derivative flags (such as the flags of Malawi, Kenya and South Sudan), although it is not known if the nationalist flag of Martinique is one of these.

In 1995, it was controversially raised in the town of Sainte-Anne by nationalist mayor Garcin Malsa. The flag was included as one of the options taken to public vote in 2023, along with many other designs using colours derived from this flag, reaching the last round of voting and ultimately second place. However, as the winner withdrew after the results were announced, and it was one of the final two options voted on in the last round of voting, the flag was considered for adoption by the Assembly on 2 February 2023, and was adopted with 44 votes in favour and one abstention.

Snake flag 

The "snake flag" features a white cross on a blue field with a white  viper (Bothrops lanceolatus), a snake species endemic to the island, in each corner. The symbol dates from an edict issued 4 August 1766, specifying that vessels of the French colony of Martinique and Saint Lucia should fly a version of the French ensign—which at the time was a white cross on a blue field—with L-shaped (for Lucia) snakes in each quarter of the cross. The same design was used for the lesser coat of arms.

The snake flag is highly controversial because of its historical use on ships engaged in the Atlantic slave trade. Deputy Jean-Philippe Nilor demanded its withdrawal from public use and even compared it to the Nazi swastika that refers to the Holocaust. In October 2018, the National Gendarmerie stopped using the emblem by order of President Emmanuel Macron.

Before the 21st century, the snake flag was largely unused in Martinique. It was mainly erroneously used as a courtesy ensign by yachters and was not available for sale locally.

The emoji of the flag is sometimes used by the Québécois as a stand in for Quebec's own flag, as there is no Quebec flag available.

Gallery

See also
 Coat of arms of Martinique
 Flags of French regions

References

External links
 
 
 Drapeau explications - Flag explanation (French)
 

1766 introductions
Flags introduced in 2023
2023 establishments in Martinique
Flags displaying animals
Flags of Overseas France
Martinican culture
Flag controversies